Cheryl Lau (born July 4, 1944) is an American former politician who served as the first Asian-American Republican Secretary of State of Nevada.

Rather than seek re-election, she ran unsuccessfully for the Republican nomination for the Nevada gubernatorial election, 1994, losing to Jim Gibbons.

References

External links

1944 births
American politicians of Chinese descent
American women of Chinese descent in politics
Nevada Republicans
Asian-American people in Nevada politics
Living people
Women in Nevada politics
20th-century American women politicians
20th-century American politicians